Cuipingshan Subdistrict is a subdistrict in Yunlong District, Xuzhou, Jiangsu, China. , it administers the following two residential communities and three villages:
Dongjun Community
Shangdong Community
Qiaojiahu Village
Changshan Village
Tushansi Village

See also 
 List of township-level divisions of Jiangsu

References 

Township-level divisions of Jiangsu
Administrative divisions of Xuzhou